The National Conference of Governor's Schools (NCoGS) is a United States national organization committed to establishing, supporting, and enriching summer residential governor's school programs. Its members are individuals involved in maintaining governor's school programs across the country, including administrators, statewide co-ordinators, faculty and staff members, alumni, parents and other friends of state-sponsored summer residential enrichment programs for gifted and talented youth.

List of members
Alabama Governor's School
Arkansas Governor's School
California State Summer School for the Arts
University of Delaware Governor's School for Excellence
Florida Governor's School for Space Science and Technology
Georgia Governor's Honors Program
Iowa Governor's Institute
Kentucky Center Governor's School for the Arts
Kentucky Governor's Scholars Program
Kentucky Governor’s School for Entrepreneurs
Louisiana Governor's Program for Gifted Children
Mississippi Governor's School
Missouri Fine Arts Academy
Missouri Scholars Academy
Governor's School of New Jersey (2 programs)
New York State Summer School of the Arts
Governor's School of North Carolina
North Dakota Governor's School
Pennsylvania Governor's School for Global Entrepreneurship
Pennsylvania Governor's School for the Sciences
University of Pittsburgh Health Career Scholars Academy
Governor's School of South Carolina
South Carolina Governor's School for the Arts and Humanities
South Carolina Governor's School for Science and Mathematics
South Dakota Governor's Camp
Tennessee Governor's Schools (12 programs)
Governor's School of Texas
The Governor's Institutes of Vermont
Virginia Summer Residential Governor's Schools
Governor's Schools of West Virginia 
Wyoming Summer High School Institute

References

External links
 NCoGS official website

Educational organizations based in the United States
Governor's Schools